The 2021 UMass Minutemen football team represented the University of Massachusetts Amherst in the 2021 NCAA Division I FBS football season. The Minutemen played their home games at Warren McGuirk Alumni Stadium and competed as an independent. They were led by third-year head coach Walt Bell; UMass fired Bell after nine games and offensive line coach Alex Miller took over as interim head coach.

Schedule

Notable players
RB Ellis Merriweather

QB Brady Olson

WR Rico Arnold

References

UMass
UMass Minutemen football seasons
UMass Minutemen football